The Teatro Municipal de Lima (Municipal Theater of Lima) is a theatre and concert hall in Lima, Peru.  It is home to the National Symphony Orchestra of Peru. The building was inaugurated in 1920 as the Teatro Forero. It was later bought by the Municipalidad Metropolitana de Lima in 1929 and renamed Teatro Municipal.

The building was partially destroyed by in 1998, and while the building was sporadically open for special performances; it remained unrestored for 12 years. The theater was eventually reconstructed following its original structural design, and it was expanded to include additional parking, anti-seismic technology and updated fireproofing.  It was re-inaugurated on October 11, 2010.  

Theatres in Peru
Buildings and structures in Lima
Buildings and structures completed in 1920
Tourist attractions in Lima